Legislative election also known as Senatorial election for the Legislature of Guam took place on November 2, 2010,  coinciding with the 2010 United States general elections and the Guam gubernatorial election. All 15 seats in the Legislature of Guam were up for election.

Primary Election
The members are elected at-large with the first 15 winning candidates are elected as the new members of the legislature. As there were many candidates running, primaries were set on September 4, 2010, for both the Democratic and Republican parties. The fifteen candidates who win the most votes go on to the General election.

General election candidates
List of candidates running for election in 2010 as they appear on the 2010 ballot.  The top fifteen vote winners from either political party will be elected. (I) indicates an incumbent member seeking re-election.

Democratic candidates
Judith T.P. Won Pat (I)
Sarah M. Thomas-Nededog
Trinidad "Trini" T. Torres
Tina Muña Barnes (I)
Benjamin J.F. Cruz (I)
Rory J. Respicio (I)
Steven A. Dierking
Thomas "Tom" C. Ada (I)
Dennis G. Rodriguez Jr.
Adolpho B. Palacios Sr.
Corinna Gutierrez-Ludwig
Judith Paulette Guthertz (I)
Vicente "Ben" Pangelinan (I)
Joe Shimizu San Agustin
Jonathan Blas Diaz

Defeated in primary
Robert L.G. Benavente
Jonathan Q. Carriaga
Phillipe J. Cruz
Tomas Megofna Fejeran

Republican candidates
Frank F. Blas Jr. (I)
Vicente Anthony "Tony" Ada (I)
William Q. Sarmiento
Telo Teresa Taitague (I)
Mana Silva Taijeron
William "Bill" Taitague
Ray Cruz Haddock
Shirley "Sam" Mabini
Victor Anthony Gaza
John B. Benavente
Stephen J. Guerrero
Christopher M. Duenas
Velma Harper
Douglas Moylan
Aline A. Yamashita

Defeated in primary
Dennis T. Borja
Armando S. Dominguez
Paul L.G. Reyes
Margarita Q. Taitano

Primary Election
The members are elected at-large with the first 15 winning candidates are elected as the new members of the legislature. As there were many candidates running, primaries were set on September 4, 2010 for both the Democratic and Republican parties. The first fifteen candidates who win the highest votes go on to the General election.

Democratic Party Primary

Republican Party Primary

General election results
Following the primaries, there were 26 candidates vying for the 15 seats in the Legislature of Guam. The members are elected at-large with the first 15 winning candidates are elected as the new members of the legislature.

References

External links 
Official Website of the Guam Election Commission

Legislative
Legislative elections in Guam
Legislative election